USS PGM-11 was a  in service with the United States Navy during World War II.

Ship history
The ship was ordered on 27 February 1942, and laid down on 27 September 1943, as PC-806 by the Commercial Iron Works in Portland, Oregon. Launched on 30 October 1943, she was reclassified as PGM-11 in August 1944. She was commissioned into naval service on 13 December 1944, with Lieutenant E. H. George, USNR, in command. She was active in the Pacific theater, primarily accompanying minesweepers in and around the Philippines. On 14 April 1945, she was damaged when she ran aground off of Kerama Retto, southwest of Okinawa. She was later refloated and repaired.

On 6 April 1945, PGM-11 assisted in the evacuation of the stricken converted minesweeper  during an attack by the Japanese off Okinawa.

She was transferred to the State Department, Foreign Liquidation Commission in October 1948. Her fate is unknown.

References

External links
Action Report, USS Emmons, 1945
U-boat.net- USS ''PGM-11
Archives PGM-11

Ships built in Portland, Oregon
1943 ships
World War II gunboats of the United States
PGM-9-class motor gunboats